Tenzin Dorji is a Bhutanese international footballer. He made his first appearance in an unofficial friendly match against India. He made his official debut in their 2019 AFC Asian Cup qualifying match second leg against Bangladesh, being named in the starting lineup and playing the whole game.

References

External links

Bhutanese footballers
Bhutan international footballers
Living people
Association football forwards
1997 births